The Stockholm municipal election of 1982 was held on 19 September 1982 concurrently with the 1982 Swedish parliamentary election.  This election used a party-list proportional representation system to allocate the 101 seats of the Stockholm City Council (Stockholms stadsfullmäktige) amongst the various Swedish political parties.  Voter turnout was 86.7%.

This election was the first held with the participation of the Swedish Green Party, which was founded in 1981.  The Greens received less than one percent of the votes in the 1982 Stockholm municipal election and thus were allocated no seats; they would receive their first mandate on the city council in 1991.

Results

See also
 Elections in Sweden
 List of political parties in Sweden
 City of Stockholm

Notes

References
Statistics Sweden, "Kommunfullmäktigval - valresultat" (Swedish) 
Statistics Sweden, "Kommunfullmäktigval - erhållna mandat efter kommun och parti. Valår 1973–2006" (Swedish) 

Municipal elections in Stockholm
1982 elections in Sweden
1980s in Stockholm
September 1982 events in Europe